Antonio de Erauso, born as Catalina de Erauso (in Spanish; or Katalina Erauso in Basque) (San Sebastián, Spain, 1585 or 1592 — Cuetlaxtla near Orizaba, New Spain, 1650), also went by Alonso Díaz and some other masculine names, later taking on the name Antonio de Erauso which he went by for the remainder of his life. He is also known in Spanish as La Monja Alférez (The Ensign Nun or The Nun Lieutenant). de Erauso was originally an unwilling nun, but escaped the convent and travelled around Spain and Spanish America, mostly under male identities, in the first half of the 17th century. Erauso's story has remained alive through historical studies, biographical stories, novels, movies and comics.

Early years 

Erauso was born in the Basque town of San Sebastián, Gipuzkoa, Spain, in either 1585 (according to some sources including a supposed autobiography of 1626) or February 10, 1592 (according to a baptismal certificate). Erauso's parents were Miguel de Erauso and Maria Pérez de Arce Galarraga, both of whom had been born and lived in San Sebastián. Miguel was a captain and military commander of the Basque province under the orders of King Philip III of Spain. From an early age, Antonio trained with his father and brothers in the arts of warfare.

Life at the convent 

Around the year 1589, at age 4, Erauso (together with sisters Isabel and Maria) was taken to the Dominican convent of San Sebastian el Antiguo, where Erauso's mother's cousin, Ursula de Uriza e Sarasti, held the position of prioress. Erauso grew into a strong, stocky, and quick-tempered individual, Lacking religious vocation and as a result feeling imprisoned and refusing to take vows, Erauso was detained in a cell and constantly fought with a widowed novice named Catalina de Aliri. At 15, after being beaten by one of the older nuns, Erauso decided to escape. On March 18, 1600, the eve of San Jose, Erauso found the keys of the convent hanging in a corner, waited for the other nuns to be at morning prayer, and escaped. Erauso spent a week fashioning boy's clothes, and headed for Vitoria, staying off the main roads. With short hair, Erauso easily passed as a boy there.

Travels around Spain 

From this moment on, Erauso began the life of a fugitive, later narrated in the autobiography that gave him great fame. In Vitoria, Erauso met a doctor and professor, Francisco de Cerralta, who was married to Erauso's mother's cousin but took Erauso in without recognizing him. Erauso stayed with him for three months, learning some Latin, but when Cerralta became abusive, Erauso left. Erauso took money from the doctor, met a mule driver and went to Valladolid with him. The court of King Philip III of Spain resided in Valladolid, under the influence of the Duke of Lerma. Disguised as a man by the name of Francisco de Loyola, Erauso served in the court for seven months as a page of the king's secretary, Juan de Idiáquez, until one day Erauso's father came looking for Idiáquez. His father conversed with Idiáquez, all without recognizing that he had just spoken to that child. Afterwards, Erauso decided to head to Bilbao.

Upon arriving, Erauso was not as lucky as before, and did not find a place to sleep nor a patron. In addition, a group of boys made fun of and attacked him, and when he got into a rock fight and injured one, he was arrested and spent a month in jail. Once released from prison, Erauso went to Estella, and found work as a page there too, under an important lord of the town called Alonso de Arellano. Erauso was his servant for two years, always well treated and well dressed. Between 1602 and 1603, after years of service to Arellano, Erauso returned to San Sebastián, his hometown, and lived as a man there, taking care of relatives, whom he saw frequently. He also attended mass in his old convent with former colleagues. It is said that he also served his aunt without ever being recognized. After some time, he came to Pasaia, where he met Captain Miguel de Berróiz, who took him to Seville. They were there for only two days. He later returned to Sanlucar de Barrameda, where he found a job as a cabin boy on a ship. Captain Esteban Eguiño, who was a cousin of Erauso's mother, owned the galleon. According to memoirs, he embarked on Holy Monday, 1603 to America. Erauso felt, like many Basques of his time, inclined to venture to the Indies.

He spent this time as a man, in masculine dress with short hair, using different names such as Pedro de Orive, Francisco de Loyola, Alonso Díaz [Ramirez] de Guzmán, and Antonio de Erauso. Apparently, his physique was not feminine, which helped him pass as a man. Erauso once said he "dried her breasts" with a secret ointment.

Travels to the New World 
The first place in the Americas where Erauso landed was Punta de Araya, now part of Venezuela, where he had a confrontation with a Dutch pirate fleet which he defeated. From there they left for Cartagena and Nombre de Dios, where they stayed for nine days. Several sailors died there because of the weather. They boarded the silver and once ready to return to Spain, Erauso shot and killed his uncle and stole 500 pesos. He told the sailors that his uncle had sent him on an errand. An hour later, the ship returned to Spain without him. From there he went with an usher to Panama, where he spent three months. In Panama he started working with Juan de Urquiza, merchant of Trujillo with whom he went to the port of Paita (now Peru), where the trader had a large shipment. In the port of Manta (now Ecuador), a strong wind destroyed the ship and Erauso had to swim to save himself and his master. The rest of the crew perished.

After a brief time in Paita, he went to Zana, a place full of cattle, grains, fruits and tobacco from Peru. There, his master happily accommodated here gave Erauso a home, clothing and a large amount of money, as well as three black slaves. In Saña he had a fight with a young man who threatened him in a comedy theater. He ended up cutting off the face of the boy who challenged him. He was taken to jail again and through efforts of his master, Juan de Urquiza, and the bishop of that place, he was released on the condition that he married Doña Beatriz de Cárdenas, lady of his master and aunt of the man who had his face cut. He refused to marry. Then he went to the city of Trujillo, where his master opened a store.

However, the man who was wounded in the face came to challenge him again accompanied by two friends. Erauso went to the fight with another person, and in the fight the man's friend was killed. He was again imprisoned, and after his master saved him again, he gave Erauso money and a letter of recommendation and sent him to Lima, which was the capital of the Viceroyalty of Peru. He gave the letter of recommendation to Diego de Solarte, a very rich merchant and greater consul of Lima, and after a few days Erauso was given his shop. He was responsible for the business for nine months, but was fired when discovered fondling a woman, the sister of his master's wife. After being dismissed, he found a company recruiting, whose aim was the conquest of Chile and, beset by the need to find a new occupation, he enlisted under the command of Captain Gonzalo Rodriguez. Erauso was accompanied by 1600 men from Lima to the city of Concepción. From 1617-19 he worked as a llama-driver from Chuquisaca to the great mining center of Potosí, and was then recruited as a soldier.

Military exploits 

After marching with his company to Chile in 1619, his army swept through the lands and property of the Mapuches; he showed his aggressive side as conqueror, massacring many Indians. In Chile the secretary of the governor was his brother Don Miguel de Erauso; the secretary welcomed him without recognizing him. He remained there for three years and because of a dispute with his brother, possibly because of a woman, was banished to Paicabí, the land of Indians. There, Erauso fought in the service of the crown in the Arauco War against the Mapuches in today's Chile, earning a reputation for being brave and skillful with weapons and without revealing that he was biologically a woman.

In the battle of Valdivia he was promoted to second lieutenant. In the following battle of Puren his captain was killed and he took command, winning the battle. However, due to the many complaints  against him for his cruelty to the Indians, Erauso was not further promoted; frustrated, he entered a period devoted to vandalizing, killing people as he met on the road, causing extensive damage and burning crops. In Concepción he assassinated the chief auditor of the city, for which he was locked in a church for six months. After being released, Antonio killed his brother Miguel  in a duel, and was again imprisoned for eight months. He later fled to the Governorate of the Río de la Plata (now Argentina) across the Andes, taking a difficult path. At the brink of death he was saved by a villager and taken to Tucumán, where he promised marriage to two young women, the daughter of an Indian widow (who had hosted Erauso on her farm during his convalescence) and the niece of a canon.

He ended up fleeing from there without marrying either of them, but kept the money and fine clothing given by the canon's niece  as a sign of love. Then he went to Potosí, where he became the assistant to a sergeant, and returned again to fight against the Indians, participating in mass killings in Chuncos. In La Plata (formerly Chuquisaca, later Sucre) he was accused of a crime he did not commit; he was tortured and finally freed again without his sex being discovered. Once out of prison, he devoted himself to smuggling wheat and cattle on the orders of Juan Lopez de Arquijo. A new lawsuit forced him to take refuge in a church. In Piscobamba he killed a person in a quarrel. This time he was sentenced to death, but was saved at the last minute by the deposition of another prisoner sentenced to death. Then he remained in sanctuary for five months in a church due to a duel with a jealous husband. When he moved to La Paz, he was sentenced again to death for another offense. To escape, he pretended to confess and, after seizing a consecrated host, fled to Cuzco and returned to Peru.

Return to Spain and audience with Pope Urban VIII 

In 1623 Erauso was arrested in Huamanga, Peru, because of a dispute. To avoid execution, he begged Bishop Agustín de Carvajal for mercy, and confessed that he was a woman who had been in a convent. Following a review in which a group of matrons determined that Erauso was a woman and a virgin, the bishop protected him and he was sent to Spain.

In 1625–1626, Erauso petitioned the Spanish Crown for financial reward for services as a soldier in the New World, presenting a relación de méritos y servicios (account of merits and services). In addition to seeking reward for time at war, Erauso also sought compensation for money lost while traveling to Rome. This document includes accounts from "witnesses" or others who knew Erauso. However, many of the accounts contradict each other, and some witnesses do not know what to make of Erauso's predicament, for several reasons, most prominently that the witnesses all knew Erauso by different names and for different accomplishments. They may have known "Alonso Díaz de Guzmán", one of the names Erauso used as a man, but they did not know Catalina de Erauso.

Scholars disagree on whether or not Erauso met Pope Urban VIII, but his Account of Merits and Services was filed in 1625 or 1626 in the Archivo General de Indias and the Real Academia de la Historia of Madrid, which would match up with accounts of him being in Rome at that time.

Return to America and death 
In 1630 Erauso settled in the New Spain, probably in the city of Orizaba, now in the state of Veracruz, and established a business as a muleteer between Mexico City and Veracruz. Locals state that Erauso died carrying a load on a boat, though some argue his death occurred at the heights of Orizaba, alone; most plausible is that he died in the village of Cotaxtla. According to the historian Joaquín Arróniz, his remains rest in the Church of the Royal Hospital of Our Lady of the Immaculate Conception of the Juaninos Brothers, which today is popularly known as the Church of San Juan de Dios, in the city of Orizaba, Veracruz, Mexico. Although there is no solid evidence to support it, some postulate that Bishop Juan de Palafox tried to move the remains to the city of Puebla, home of the bishopric, but failed. Instead, according to other historians, the remains of Erauso rest in the same place where it is believed he died, in the village of Cotaxtla. However, there is no documentation that can demonstrate the exact date and place of death.

Autobiography and controversy over its authorship 
Antonio de Erauso (under the name Catalina de Erauso) wrote or dictated the autobiography which remained in manuscript form until it was first published in Paris in 1829 at the request of Joaquín María Ferrer, a second time in Barcelona in 1838, and for the third time in 1894 in Paris, with illustrations by Spanish artist Daniel Vierge. Then his account was translated into several languages and versions of the theme, as idealized by Thomas De Quincey, entitled The Ensign Nun in English.

In addition to these editions, a series of reprints of this autobiography after 1894, and writings about Erauso's return to Spain, a comedy was released by Juan Pérez de Montalbán, Comedia famosa de la Monja Alferez (1625). Currently, there is debate among researchers about the authorship of this autobiography, which some researchers have branded as apocryphal and without any basis for engaging in some chronological inaccuracies and contradictions. However, given the existence of baptism certificates and testimonies from others about Erauso's life and works, there is strong evidence for the historical existence of this person.

Some have wanted to see a relationship between Erauso's extraordinary life, and the Baroque taste for portraying marginal and / or deformed or abnormal characters, as the main reason for the fame he gained throughout the Hispanic world on his return from America.

Questions of gender and sexual identity 
Modern scholars have debated Erauso's sexual orientation and gender identity. In a memoir, Erauso never mentions being attracted to a man, but details numerous relationships with women. There was an encounter with the sister-in-law of a Lima merchant, a quarrel with Erauso's brother over his mistress and other occasions of Erauso being betrothed to women in the New World. Those betrothals, however, usually ended after Erauso exploited the situation and rode off with gifts and dowry money. Erauso also mentions once being surprised by a hostess "touching between her legs," and also acknowledges having taken advantage twice of being 'disguised' as a man to get gifts from a future fiancée who did not know Erauso's sex.

Other scholars, such as Sherry Velasco, have also written on the subject of gender and sexual identity. Velasco and others argue for viewing Erauso as transgender, and Velasco also argues for viewing Erauso as lesbian, saying that, over the years since the first printings of Erauso's memoirs, there have been many different retellings and exaggerations in an effort to "de-lesbianize" Erauso through the invention of different heterosexual relationships as well as downplaying Erauso's relationships and behavior with other women. This happened mostly in versions of the story told and published in the nineteenth century. In the twentieth century, Velasco argues there was a "re-lesbianization" of Erauso, . Then, in the 1980s, Erauso appeared as a "melancholy lesbian whose lover dies and a voyeuristic lesbian whose narrative ends with the optimistic image of the protagonist accompanied by the object of her sexual desire."

Matthew Goldmark, in turn, takes the approach of examining Erauso's Accounts of Merits and Services document, and in particular the "hábitos" or "habits" section of the document, with an eye to Erauso's sexual orientation and identity. This section gives accounts from witnesses or other people who knew Erauso and could speak to his demeanor in petitioning the King and the Pope. This section also was an intersection of not only gender, but also class and profession.

Regardless of how Erauso identified, researchers are still divided as to the reason for Erauso's grand story of adventures. Some argue that Erauso had to pretend to be attracted to women in order to stay disguised and to blend in with fellow Spanish soldiers. Others argue that Erauso was actually a lesbian who used dress as a way to not attract attention from church authorities and to continue to be attracted to women. Still others fall into the third camp that Erauso actually did identify as a man. Those in this school of thought conclude from the evidence given by Erauso that Erauso was merely expressing a gender identity and was transgender. Antonio de Erauso refers to himself as a man and chose to live as a man, even after being outed as someone born female.

Legacy 
Despite the existence of autobiographical memoirs probably written around 1626, Erauso ended up disappearing from most known historical records, specifically in the period running between returning to Spain in 1624 and returning to the Indies, until the eighteenth century. At the end of the century, states Sonia Pérez-Villanueva, one Domingo de Urbirú had in his possession a manuscript copy of Erauso's memoirs, which was duplicated by a friend, the poet and playwright Cándido Maria Trigueros.

One of the copies made by Trigueros ended up in the hands of the academic Juan Bautista Muñoz, who was writing the History of the New World and included a mention of Erauso in his work. Eventually, the copy was used as a reference by Muñoz finished in the hands of the Royal Academy of History in 1784, and later was rediscovered in the early nineteenth century by the politician Felipe Bauzá, who persuaded his friend, the astronomer and merchant Joaquín María Ferrer for publishing. Finally, the manuscript was published in 1829 in Paris by Jules Didot with the title La historia de la Monja Alférez, escrita por ella misma ("story of The Nun Lieutenant, written by herself"), and a few decades later was republished by Heredia in 1894, making this version of the autobiography the revival of interest and research into Erauso's life.

The character of The Nun Lieutenant was, and remains today, a source of inspiration for writers, playwrights, filmmakers and artists (most notably a 1630 portrait, attributed to Juan van der Hamen). In the nineteenth century, the work of Thomas De Quincey stands out, who turns Erauso into a typically romantic character, victim of fate and immersed in a series of adventures. Also in the nineteenth century is the novel by Eduardo Blasco Del claustro al campamento o la Monja Alférez. And similarly it has been a source of inspiration for many analyses and academic papers trying to explain Erauso's complex personality. In the twentieth century the Monja Alférez hit the screens and became more popular through several film versions, as in La Monja Alférez, directed by Mexican Emilio Gómez Muriel (1947). At present, this character is attractive to the poststructuralist critique, as a clear example of instability and relativity of the notion of gender in the construction of the identity of an individual.

In 2019 textual analysis concluded that a 17th-century play called La Monja Alférez whose authorship had not been known had in fact been written by Juan Ruiz de Alarcón.

See also
 Eleno de Céspedes

References

Further reading 
 Belén Castro Morales. "Catalina De Erauso, La Monja Amazona." Revista De Crítica Literaria Latinoamericana 26, no. 52 (2000): 227-42. Accessed June 28, 2020. doi:10.2307/4531130.

Bibliography 
 
 
 
  Historia de la monja alférez escrita por ella misma. Presentación y epílogo de Jesús Munárriz. Madrid, Ediciones Hiperión,2000. 
  Historia de la monja alférez. Amigos del Libro Vasco, Echevarri,1986.
  Historia de la monja alférez D.ª Catalina de Erauso. Catalina de Erauso. Barcelona : Imp. de José Tauló, 1838
  Miguel de Erauso (senior), el abuelo de la Monja Alférez: una inmersión en la vida donostiarra (1592). José Ignacio Tellechea Idigoras. En: Boletín de estudios históricos sobre San Sebastián. n. 39 (2005), p. 81-154
  Doña Catalina de Erauso: la monja alférez: IV centenario de su nacimiento. José Ignacio Tellechea Idígoras. 
  Historia del Nuevo Mundo. Juan Bautista Muñoz. Madrid, 1794
  La historia de la Monja Alférez, escrita por ella misma. Catalina de Erauso. Comentada y editada por Joaquín María Ferrer. París: Imp. de Julio Didot, 1829
  La historia de la monja Alférez, escrita por ella misma. Catalina de Erauso. Traducción de José María de Heredia. París, 1894

16th-century births
1650 deaths
People of the Arauco War
Basque explorers
Basque women
17th-century Spanish people
17th-century LGBT people
Colonial Mexico
Female wartime cross-dressers
People from San Sebastián
Women in 17th-century warfare
Female explorers
Women in war in South America
Transgender writers
Spanish conquistadors
Spanish female military personnel
Historical figures with ambiguous or disputed gender identity